A. L. Subramanian (born 5 September 1944) was an Indian politician and former Member of the Legislative Assembly (MLA). He also served as the Mayor of Tirunelveli Corporation during the period 2006
-2011.

Subbramanian was elected to the Tamil Nadu legislative assembly as a Dravida Munnetra Kazhagam (DMK) candidate from Tirunelveli constituency in 1967, 1989 and 1996 elections.

Subramanian died, aged 73, on 27 October 2012. He was survived by his wife, two sons, and two daughters. He was known as one of the many effective politicians in Tamil Nadu. The former Secretary of the M.D.T HINDU SCHOOL COMMITTEE  also served as Worshipful Mayor of Tirunelveli City. A lawyer by profession, he was a trustee of the Tuticorin Port Trust and Additional Central Government Standing Counsel. His contribution to the cause of higher education in and around Tirunelveli district is highly laudable. It is due to his earnest efforts and influence that the Manonmaniam Sundaranar University was established in Tirunelveli.

References 

2012 deaths
Dravida Munnetra Kazhagam politicians
Tamil Nadu MLAs 1996–2001
People from Tirunelveli
1944 births